Muneeb Diwan (born 20 March 1972 in St. Stephen, New Brunswick, Canada) is a Canadian cricket player. He is a right-handed batsman.

He played first-class cricket for Essex in 1994 and played second XI cricket for them until 1996. He first represented Canada in the 1997 ICC Trophy, and went on to play for them in the 2001 ICC Trophy and 1998 Commonwealth Games, amongst other occasions.

References
Cricket Archive profile

Cricketers from New Brunswick
Canadian cricketers
Essex cricketers
1972 births
Living people
Cricketers at the 1998 Commonwealth Games
Commonwealth Games competitors for Canada